Międzygórze is a village in the administrative district of Gmina Bystrzyca Kłodzka, within Kłodzko County, Lower Silesian Voivodeship, in south-western Poland.

The village has a population of 700.

Notable residents
 Rudolf Jaenisch (born 1942), German scientist

References

Villages in Kłodzko County